Lerista is a diverse (~ 90 species) genus of skinks endemic to Australia, commonly known as sliders. The genus is especially notable for the variation in the amount of limb reduction. The variation ranges from short-bodied forms with large legs bearing five toes, to elongate forms completely lacking legs. Their locomotion is linked to their body shape. The shorter skinks with prominent limbs travel on the surface; the longer skinks with reduced legs tend to burrow more. A phylogenetic tree of Lerista, derived from DNA analysis, reveals that limb loss has happened multiple times within this group. Limb loss has occurred relatively recently, in the past 3.6 million years or so.

Species
The following species are recognized as being valid.

Note: a binomial authority in parentheses indicates that the species was originally described in a genus other than Lerista.

Lerista aericeps  – desert plain slider
Lerista alia  – Bulleringa fine-lined slider
Lerista allanae  – Allan's lerista, Allan's skink, greater robust fine-lined slider
Lerista allochira  – Cape Range slider
Lerista ameles  – limbless fine-lined slider
Lerista amicorum  – Fortescue three-toed slider
Lerista anyara  – Olkola slider skink
Lerista apoda  – Dampier Land limbless slider
Lerista arenicola  – bight slider 
Lerista axillaris  – stripe-sided robust slider
Lerista baynesi  – Bayne's slider
Lerista bipes  – north-western sandslider
Lerista borealis  – inland Kimberley slider
Lerista bougainvillii  – Bougainville's skink 
Lerista bunglebungle  – Bunglebungle robust slider
Lerista carpentariae  – Carpentaria fine-lined slider
Lerista chalybura  – Pilbara blue-tailed slider
Lerista chordae  – lyre-patterned slider
Lerista christinae  – bold-striped slider, Christina's lerista
Lerista cinerea  – vine-thicket fine-lined slider
Lerista clara  – sharp-blazed three-toed slider
Lerista colliveri  – nubbinned fine-lined slider
Lerista connivens  – blinking broad-blazed slider 
Lerista desertorum  – Central Deserts robust slider
Lerista distinguenda  – south-western orange-tailed slider
Lerista dorsalis  – southern slider
Lerista edwardsae  – Myall slider
Lerista elegans  – elegant slider
Lerista elongata  – wide-striped mulch slider
Lerista emmotti  – Noonbah robust slider
Lerista eupoda  – Meekatharra slider 
Lerista flammicauda  – Pilbara flame-tailed slider 
Lerista fragilis  – eastern mulch-slider 
Lerista frosti  – centralian slider
Lerista gascoynensis  – Gascoyne broad-blazed slider
Lerista gerrardii  – bold-striped robust slider
Lerista greeri  – south-eastern Kimberley sandslider
Lerista griffini  – stout sandslider
Lerista haroldi  – Gnaraloo mulch-slider
Lerista hobsoni  
Lerista humphriesi  – taper-tailed west-coast slider
Lerista ingrami  – McIvor River slider
Lerista ips  – robust duneslider 
Lerista jacksoni  – Jackson's three-toed slider, Jackson's slider
Lerista kalumburu  – Kalumburu slider
Lerista karlschmidti  – lesser robust fine-lined slider   
Lerista kendricki  – dark broad-blazed slider
Lerista kennedyensis  – Kennedy Range broad-blazed slider
Lerista kingi  – King's three-toed slider, King's slider
Lerista labialis  – southern sandslider
Lerista lineata  – Perth slider 
Lerista lineopunctulata  – dotted-line robust slider, West Coast line-spotted lerista
Lerista macropisthopus  – unpatterned robust slider
Lerista micra  – micro three-toed slider, little slider
Lerista microtis  – south-western slider
Lerista miopus  
Lerista muelleri  – wood mulch-slider, Mueller's three-toed lerista
Lerista neander  – Pilbara robust slider
Lerista nevinae  – Nevin's three-toed slider, Nevin's slider
Lerista nichollsi  – inland broad-blazed slider
Lerista occulta  – hidden three-toed slider, Carnarvon slider
Lerista onsloviana  – Onslow broad-blazed slider
Lerista orientalis  – north-eastern orange-tailed slider
Lerista parameles  – Chillagoe fine-lined slider
Lerista petersoni  – pale broad-blazed slider 
Lerista picturata  – southern robust slider 
Lerista planiventralis  – keeled slider
Lerista praefrontalis  – Yampi sandslider
Lerista praepedita   – western worm lerista, blunt-tailed west-coast slider
Lerista punctatovittata  – eastern robust slider 
Lerista puncticauda  – dotty-tailed robust slider
Lerista quadrivincula  – four-chained slider
Lerista robusta  – brad-eyed sandslider
Lerista rochfordensis  – Rochford slider
Lerista rolfei  – Rolfe's three-toed slider, Rolfe's slider
Lerista separanda  – Dampierland plain slider
Lerista simillima  – Fitzroy sandslider
Lerista speciosa  – pale-striped mulch-slider
Lerista stictopleura  – spotted broad-blazed slider
Lerista storri  –  Mount Surprise slider, Storr's lerista
Lerista stylis  – Arnhem Coast fine-lined slider
Lerista taeniata  – ribbon slider, ribbon lerista 
Lerista terdigitata  - robust mulch-slider 
Lerista timida  – dwarf three-toed slider, wood mulch-slider
Lerista tridactyla  – dark-backed mulch-slider
Lerista uniduo  – slender broad-blazed slider 
Lerista vanderduysi  – leaden-bellied fine-lined slider
Lerista varia  – Shark Bay broad-blazed slider
Lerista verhmens  – powerful three-toed slider 
Lerista vermicularis  – slender duneslider
Lerista viduata  – Ravensthorpe Range slider
Lerista vittata  – Mount Cooper striped lerista, side-striped fine-lined slider
Lerista walkeri  – coastal Kimberley slider
Lerista wilkinsi  – two-toed fine-lined slider 
Lerista xanthura  – yellow-tailed plain slider
Lerista yuna  – Yuna broad-blazed slider
Lerista zonulata  – north-eastern orange-tailed slider

References

Further reading
Bell, Thomas (1833). "Characters of two New Genera of Reptiles". Proceedings of the Zoological Society of London 1833 (1): 98–99. (Lerista, new genus, p. 99).

External links
 Herpetology - Limb reduction in Australian lizards

 
Lizard genera
Taxa named by Thomas Bell (zoologist)